The 1945–46 season was Stoke City's eleventh and final season in the non-competitive War League.
 
In 1939 World War II was declared and the Football League was cancelled. In its place were formed War Leagues and cups, based on geographical lines rather than based on previous league placement. However, none of these were considered to be competitive football, and thus their records are not recognised by the Football League and thus not included in official records. The FA Cup made a welcome return after seven years out. However Stoke were involved in the Burnden Park disaster.

Season review
Crowds up and down the country, including Stoke's were now beginning to show an increase as the situation in Europe began to improve and when the 1945–46 season commenced there was a feeling that the Football League would not be too long in starting up again, especially now that the FA Cup was reinstated into the fixture list, with clubs playing ties over two legs. For the final war time league season the idea of two phases of league fixtures was scrapped and a more traditional format took its place and Stoke finished in 13th position.

In the FA Cup Stoke progressed past Burnley and both Sheffield clubs United then Wednesday before drawing Bolton Wanderers in the quarter final. The first leg was played at the Victoria Ground on 2 March 1946, Bolton won the match 2–0 to put them in prime position to reach the semi final. However tragedy struck in the second leg at Burnden Park as crush barriers gave way on part of the terracing and 33 spectators were killed with another 520 injured. The match itself was delayed from some time and it eventually finished goalless.

Final league table

Results

Stoke's score comes first

Legend

Football League North

FA Cup

Squad statistics
Note: Only the FA Cup appearances are considered as official competitive matches

References

Stoke City F.C. seasons
Stoke City